Jingju Temple is a Buddhist temple located on Mount Qingyuan, in Qingyuan District of Ji'an, Jiangxi, China.

History

Tang dynasty
Jingju Temple was first construction as "Anyin Temple" in 705 by an accomplished Chan master Qingyuan Xingsi, under the Tang dynasty (618–907). Qingyuan Xingsi settled at Anyin Temple, where he promulgated Buddhist doctrines and disseminated Buddhism for more than 27 years, and attracted large numbers of practitioners.

In 749, after Jianzhen's east crossing failed, he lived here for a short time. He visited the Pagoda of Seventh Patriarch with Japanese monk Puzhao.

Since Emperor Wuzong (841–846) believed in Taoism, he ordered to demolish Buddhist temples, confiscate temple lands and force monks to return to secular life. Anyin Temple was completely destroyed in the massive movement which known as the "Great Anti-Buddhist Persecution".

The temple was rebuilt in 851, in the reign of Emperor Xuanzong (847–860).

Song dynasty
In 1066, in the 3rd year of Zhiping period (1064–1067) in the Song dynasty (960–1279), Emperor Yingzong inscribed and honored the name "Anyin Temple".

In 1104, Emperor Huizong renamed it "Jingju Temple", which is still in use now. At that time, the temple had reached unprecedented heyday with one thousand monks lived there.

Yuan dynasty
In the late Yuan dynasty (1271–1368), Jingju Temple was devastated by war, when Red Turban Rebellion fought against the Mongolian army.

Ming dynasty
In 1376, in the early Ming dynasty (1368–1644), Chan master Shigong restored and redecorated the temple.

In 1514, in the ruling of Zhengde Emperor, Wang Yangming, an exceptional Neo-Confucianism philosopher and educator, often gave lectures here.

The temple went to ruin at the end of the Ming dynasty.

Qing dynasty
During the Shunzhi era (1644–1661) of the Qing dynasty (1644–1911), abbot Xiaofeng renovated the Pilu Hall, Yanshou Hall and Chuanxin Hall, and compiled the Records of Qingyuan Mountains.

Republic of China
During the Republic of China (1912–1949), abbot Gaoguang repaired and refurbished the temple.

People's Republic of China
After the establishment of the Communist State, the temple went into decline while the loss of government support.

In 1966, Mao Zedong launched the Cultural Revolution, the Red Guards had attacked the temple in this ten-year massive socialist movement, the temple was dilapidated with huge losses of the cultural relics.

Jingju Temple has been designated as a National Key Buddhist Temple in Han Chinese Area in 1983.

After the 3rd Plenary Session of the 11th Central Committee of the Chinese Communist Party, according to the national policy of free religious belief, Jingju Temple was officially reopened to the public in 1984. That same year, the local government has allocated CN¥2 million for the reconstruction project.

In the winter of 1990, Shi Tiguang was unanimously chosen as new abbot of the temple.

In January 2014, the temple was listed among the second group of "National Religious Base for Patriotism Education".

Architecture

Along the central axis are the Shanmen, Four Heavenly Kings Hall, Mahavira Hall, Pilu Hall, Buddhist Texts Library, and the Pagoda of Seventh Patriarch.

Hall of Four Heavenly Kings
Maitreya is enshrined in the Hall of Four Heavenly Kings and at the back of his statue is a statue of Skanda. Statues of Four Heavenly Kings are enshrined in the left and right side of the hall.

Mahavira Hall
The Mahavira Hall is the main hall in the temple. In the middle of the hall placed the statue of Sakyamuni, with statues of Eighteen Arhats stand on both sides of the hall.

Pilu Hall
Behind the Mahavira Hall is the Pilu Hall. The hall, for the worship of Vairocana, more commonly known as "Pilu Buddha" in Chinese.

Pagoda of Seventh Patriarch
The Pagoda of Seventh Patriarch was originally built in the reign of Emperor Xuanzong of Tang dynasty. The  pagoda has granite structure with five storeys and five sides. Curved bars and cornices are set on each story, which are magnificent and become the symbol of Jingju Temple. Its body are engraved with Chinese characters "Pagoda of the Seventh Patriarch Hongji Chan Master in the Tang dynasty after his Parinirvana".

References

Bibliography
 

Buddhist temples in Jiangxi
Buildings and structures in Ji'an
Tourist attractions in Ji'an
20th-century establishments in China
20th-century Buddhist temples
Religious buildings and structures completed in 1984